The 1965–66 Football League season was Birmingham City Football Club's 63rd in the Football League and their 25th in the Second Division, to which they were relegated in 1964–65. Having persuaded former Wolverhampton Wanderers manager Stan Cullis out of retirement as successor to Joe Mallett, who remained with the club as Cullis's assistant, they finished in tenth position in the 22-team division. They entered the 1965–66 FA Cup in the third round proper and lost to Leicester City in the fourth, and were beaten in their opening second-round match in the League Cup by Mansfield Town.

Twenty-two players made at least one appearance in nationally organised first-team competition, and there were thirteen different goalscorers. Forward Alec Jackson played in all but two of the team's 45 matches, and Geoff Vowden finished as leading scorer with 23 goals, of which 21 came in league competition.

This season saw the introduction of substitutes into the Football League. In the third game of the season, away to Preston North End on 26 August, Brian Sharples replaced the injured Ron Wylie to become Birmingham's first Football League substitute.

Football League Second Division

League table (part)

FA Cup

League Cup

Appearances and goals

Numbers in parentheses denote appearances as substitute.
Players with name struck through and marked  left the club during the playing season.

See also
Birmingham City F.C. seasons

References
General 
 
 Source for match dates and results: 
 Source for kit: "Birmingham City". Historical Football Kits. Retrieved 22 May 2018.Specific'

Birmingham City F.C. seasons
Birmingham City